Mwenge is a county of the Kyenjojo district in Uganda. It makes up the western half of the district. It contains twelve sub-counties and four town councils, namely:
Butunduzi
Katooke
Kyarusozi
Kyenjojo

Constituencies of Mwenge
Mwenge North
Mwenge Central
Mwenge South

Sub-Counties
Butiiti
Bugaki
Bufunjo
Katooke
Kyarusozi
Matiri
Nyabuharwa
Kigaraale
Butunduuzi
Kyembogo 
Kihuura
Barahiija

References

Counties of Kyenjojo District